The 2010 Formula 3 Brazil Open was the inaugural Formula 3 Brazil Open race held at Autódromo José Carlos Pace from January 21–24, 2010. There were private pre-event test sessions at Autódromo Internacional Nelson Piquet and Autódromo Internacional Ayrton Senna.

After a weekend of competition, British driver William Buller of the Hitech Racing Brazil outfit was crowned as the race champion, beating a host of Formula Three Sudamericana drivers, as well as André Negrão competing for the Cesario Fórmula team, who would drive in the Eurocup Formula Renault 2.0 championship later in the 2010 season. After Buller qualified on pole position for the first race, he and Negrão took a victory apiece with Yann Cunha finishing third in both races. Negrão won the third race, the pre-final, before Buller claimed the main event by nearly nine seconds from Negrão. Cunha finished third ahead of Razia Sports' Bruno Andrade, and Negrão's team-mate Vittorio Ghirelli completed the top five placings. In Class B the Brazilian of the RC3 Bassani was the winner.

Drivers and teams
 All cars are powered by Berta engines, and will run on Pirelli tyres. All teams were Brazilian-registered.

Classification

Qualifying

Race 1

Race 2

Pre-final Grid

Pre-final Race

Final Race

See also
Formula Three Sudamericana
Formula Three

References

External links
Official website of the Formula 3 Brazil Open

Formula 3 Brazil Open
Formula 3 Brazil Open
Brazil
Brazil F3